Pencil of Doom! is the second book of the Schooling Around series by Andy Griffiths. It was published in 2008 by Pan Macmillan Australia.

2008 Australian novels
Pan Books books
Australian children's novels
2008 children's books
Novels set in schools
Novels by Andy Griffiths